Arnaud François Christian Cochet (born 2 July 1959 in Dinan, France) is a French senior civil servant. He is currently serving as Prefect of the Department of Ain.

Honours and decorations

National honours

Ministerial honours

References

1959 births
French civil servants
Living people
People from Dinan
Prefects of Ain